Roy Maxwell Alvis (born February 2, 1938) is an American former professional baseball player. He played in Major League Baseball as a third baseman from  through , most notably for the Cleveland Indians where he became a two-time All-Star. He played his final season with the Milwaukee Brewers.

Early life
Alvis was born in Jasper, Texas, and graduated from Jasper High School (Jasper, Texas). He attended the University of Texas at Austin.

Professional career
Alvis was signed by the Cleveland Indians as an amateur free agent in 1958. He played his first major league game on September 11, 1962, with the Cleveland Indians.

He enjoyed single-season career-high numbers in batting average (.274), RBI (67), runs (81), hits (165), doubles (32) and triples (7).

His batting average fell to .223 as a full-time player in 1968, and he was relegated to spot duty with Cleveland in 1969, appearing in only 66 games.

He was traded along with Russ Snyder from the Indians to the Brewers for Roy Foster, Frank Coggins and cash during spring training on April 4, 1970. As a backup in Milwaukee, he hit .183 with three homers in 62 games, being released at the end of the season.

References

External links

1938 births
Living people
American League All-Stars
Baseball players from Texas
Cleveland Indians players
Major League Baseball third basemen
Milwaukee Brewers players
Minot Mallards players
People from Jasper, Texas
Salt Lake City Bees players
Selma Cloverleafs players
Texas Longhorns baseball players